Aronas is an Australian jazz ensemble fronted by New Zealand born pianist Aron Ottignon. They combine jazz with South Pacific drumming. They were nominated for the 2005 ARIA Award for Best Jazz Album for their Culture Tunnels album.

Members
Aron Ottignon - piano
David Symes  - bass
Evan Mannell - drums
Josh Green - percussion

Discography

Albums

Awards and nominations

ARIA Music Awards
The ARIA Music Awards is an annual awards ceremony that recognises excellence, innovation, and achievement across all genres of Australian music. They commenced in 1987. 

! 
|-
| 2005
| Culture Tunnels
| Best Jazz Album
| 
| 
|-

References

Australian jazz ensembles